Myung-whun Chung (born 22 January 1953, Seoul) is a South Korean conductor and pianist.

Career

Performer

Chung studied piano with Maria Curcio and won joint second-prize in the 1974 International Tchaikovsky Competition. He performed in the Chung Trio with his sisters, violinist Kyung-wha Chung and cellist Myung-wha Chung.

Conducting and musical direction

Chung studied conducting at the Mannes College of Music and the Juilliard School. He has conducted virtually all the prominent European and American orchestras including the Metropolitan Opera in New York, the Los Angeles Philharmonic, the Chicago Philharmonic, the Berlin Philharmonic, and the Vienna Philharmonic, among others.

Chung was chief conductor of the Rundfunk-Sinfonieorchester Saarbrücken from 1984 to 1990, and principal guest conductor of the Teatro Comunale Florence from 1987 to 1992. At the end of the 1987–88 seasons, he received the Premio Abbiati award from Italian critics, and the following year awarded the Arturo Toscanini prize. Chung was the Paris Opera's music director from 1989 to 1994, during which time he opened the inaugural season at the new Opéra Bastille. He opened the inaugural season at the new Opéra Bastille with Berlioz's complete Les Troyens and received highly praised reviews from the music circle. In 1991, the Association of French Theatres and Music Critics named him "Artist of the year" and in 1992 he received the Legion d'Honneur for his contribution to the Paris Opéra. An exclusive recording artist for Deutsche Grammophon since 1990, many of his numerous recordings have won international prizes and awards. These include Olivier Messiaen's Turangalîla-Symphonie and Éclairs sur l'au-delà…, Verdi's Otello, Berlioz's Symphonie fantastique, Shostakovich's Lady Macbeth of Mtsensk with the Bastille Opera Orchestra; a series of Dvořák's symphonies and serenades with the Vienna Philharmonic Orchestra, a series dedicated to the great sacred music with the Orchestra dell'Accademia Nazionale di Santa Cecilia, including the award-winning recording of Duruflé's and Fauré's Requiems with Cecilia Bartoli and Bryn Terfel.
In 1995 he was honoured three times at the French Victoires de la Musiques Classiques, and was also named Meilleur Chef d'Orchestre de l'Année. He directed the world premiere of Messiaen's last work: the Concert à quatre for four soloists and orchestra, which the composer had dedicated to Myung-whun Chung and the Orchestre de la Bastille. 
He took the role of artistic director at the Asia Philharmonic Orchestra in 1997 and at the Orchestre philharmonique de Radio France in 2000. The Tokyo Philharmonic Orchestra made Chung a Special Artistic Advisor in 2001, its Honorary Conductor Laureate from 2010, and its Honorary Music Director from 2016. Chung became the first principal guest conductor in the history of the Staatskapelle Dresden in 2012. He was the Seoul Philharmonic Orchestra's principal conductor between 2005 and 2015. During this period the Seoul Philharmonic became the first Asian orchestra to sign a major-label record deal and gave its first performance at The Proms.

In addition to being awarded numerous music prizes, Myung-whun Chung has also been honoured with Korea's most distinguished cultural award ‘Kumkwan’ for his contribution to Korean musical life and was named "Man of the year" by UNESCO. He served as Ambassador for the Drug Control Program at the United Nations and was Korea's Honorary Cultural Ambassador, the first in the Korean government's history.

Recordings

His recordings since 1990 include
 Messiaen: Turangalîla-Symphonie and Éclairs sur l'au-delà...
 Verdi: Otello
 Berlioz: Symphonie fantastique
 Ravel: La Valse with the Seoul Philharmonic Orchestra
 Rimsky-Korsakov: Sheherazade
 Stravinsky: Firebird Suite
 Shostakovich: Lady Macbeth of Mtsensk with the Opéra Bastille Orchestra
 Dvořák: symphonies and serenades with the Vienna Philharmonic
 Beethoven: Für Elise
 Bizet: L'Arlesienne Suite No. 1 with the Opéra Bastille Orchestra
 a series dedicated to sacred music with the Orchestra dell'Accademia Nazionale di Santa Cecilia, including the Requiems of Maurice Duruflé and Gabriel Fauré

Honours
 Premio Abbiati, 1988
Arturo Toscanini prize, 1989
'Artist of the Year' (The Association of French Theatres and Music Critics), 1991
Legion of Honour, 1992
Conductor of the year (Victoires de la musique classique), 1995.
 Order of Cultural Merit (Korea), 1996
 Ho-Am Prize in the Arts, 1997
 Ordre des Arts et des Lettres, Commandeur, 2011
 Order of the Star of Italy, Commander, 2017
 Order of the Star of Italy, Grand Officer, 2022 

UNESCO 'Man of the Year', 1995
Chung served as Ambassador for the Drug Control Program at the United Nations and was Korea's first Honorary Cultural Ambassador.

References

External links
 
 Askonas Holt agency profile of Myung-whun Chung
 Myung-whun Chung biography at the Bach Cantatas Website

South Korean conductors (music)
South Korean classical pianists
Music directors (opera)
1953 births
People from Seoul
Living people
ECM Records artists
Deutsche Grammophon artists
Recipients of the Legion of Honour
Recipients of the Order of Cultural Merit (Korea)
Commandeurs of the Ordre des Arts et des Lettres
Pupils of Maria Curcio
Prize-winners of the International Tchaikovsky Competition
21st-century conductors (music)
Recipients of the Ho-Am Prize in the Arts
Mannes School of Music alumni
Juilliard School alumni